Seo Ki-bok (Korea: 서기복; born January 28, 1979) is a former South Korean football player who plays at midfielder.

He played in 1999 FIFA World Youth Championship with Seol Ki-hyeon, Lee Dong-gook. And he scored against Mali.

He was part of the South Korea U-23 team, who finished third in Group A.

Club career 
2001–2002 Sangmu - army
2003 Jeonbuk Hyundai Motors
2004–2007 Incheon United

External links
 
 National Team Player Record 
 
 

1979 births
Living people
Association football midfielders
South Korean footballers
Gimcheon Sangmu FC players
Jeonbuk Hyundai Motors players
Incheon United FC players
K League 1 players
Sportspeople from Incheon
Footballers at the 1998 Asian Games
Asian Games competitors for South Korea
South Korea international footballers